Ken Iwao (岩尾 憲, born April 18, 1988) is a Japanese professional footballer who plays as a defensive midfielder for J1 League club Urawa Red Diamonds, on loan from Tokushima Vortis.

Club statistics

Honours

Club
Urawa Red Diamonds
Japanese Super Cup: 2022

References

External links
Profile at Tokushima Vortis
Profile at Urawa Reds

1988 births
Living people
Nippon Sport Science University alumni
Association football people from Gunma Prefecture
Japanese footballers
J1 League players
J2 League players
Shonan Bellmare players
Mito HollyHock players
Tokushima Vortis players
Urawa Red Diamonds players
Association football midfielders